Edwin Neve (3 May 1885 – 3 August 1920), sometimes known as Ned Neve, was a professional footballer who played as an outside left in the Football League for Derby County, Nottingham Forest and Hull City. He also played for Chesterfield Town, St Helens Recreation and Prescot.

Personal life 
As of 1901, Neve was working as a labourer and as of May 1916, he was working as a brewer's traveller. In May 1916, in the middle of the First World War, he was conscripted into the Royal Garrison Artillery as a bombardier and served on the Western Front and in the Army of Occupation. Neve died of heart problems in 1920, as a result of being gassed during the war. He died in Derby and was buried in Prescot Parish Churchyard.

Career statistics

References

Military personnel from Lancashire
Burials in Lancashire
English footballers
St Helens Recreation F.C. players
Hull City A.F.C. players
Derby County F.C. players
Nottingham Forest F.C. players
Chesterfield F.C. wartime guest players
English Football League players
1885 births
1920 deaths
Association football outside forwards
Sportspeople from Prescot
British Army personnel of World War I
Royal Garrison Artillery soldiers
Prescot Cables F.C. players
British military personnel killed in World War I